The Bradford Hotel in Sedan, Kansas was built in 1904.  It was listed on the National Register of Historic Places in 2007.

It is Early Commercial in style.  It has also been known as the Huffman Hotel.  It was built as a 38-room hotel.

It was deemed notable "for its significance to the development of downtown Sedan. The hotel was constructed during a time of economic boom following the discovery nearby of oil and gas. Businessmen and workers associated with the oil, gas, and cattle industries that have been integral to the local economy frequented the hotel during its seventy years in operation."

References

Hotel buildings on the National Register of Historic Places in Kansas
Early Commercial architecture in the United States
Hotel buildings completed in 1904
Chautauqua County, Kansas